The Château de Wangenbourg is a ruined castle in the commune of Wangenbourg-Engenthal in the Bas-Rhin département of France.

In 1504, Holy Roman Emperor Maximilien I, having vanquished the Prince-elector, Philipp, in the war of succession of Bavaria, confiscated the castle from the Lords of Wangen, cousins Hans and Stephan von Wangen, for the favor to count Tiestein, who himself gave it to the Archbishop of Strasbourg, Wilhelm III von Hohnstein, in 1516. Nevertheless, a branch of descendants of the von Wangens, Georg and Hartmann, continued to occupy the castle. Between 1535 and 1550, they reconstructed their logis in the Renaissance style (see photograph below).

From 1578, the Archbishop of Strasbourg and the lords of Wangen disputed property rights concerning the castle. The Wangens were expelled in 1578, but re-established their rights in 1595. In 1680, the castle was occupied by French troops. In 1702, it was in ruins.

Restoration of the castle started at the beginning of the 20th century, and again in 1931. The footbridge in the photograph was constructed in 1961 to replace the old drawbridge.

Plan

Remains
The vast polygonal enceinte is still visible, as well as the bases of the walls on the interior buildings. The castle ruins have been listed since 6 December 1898 as a monument historique by the French Ministry of Culture and is privately owned.

Gallery

See also

List of castles in France

References

External links
 
 

Ruined castles in Bas-Rhin
Monuments historiques of Bas-Rhin